Guy Aroch is an Israeli American New York-based fashion and celebrity photographer who emigrated from Israel in 1988. He lives and works in New York City and Los Angeles.

Aroch moved to New York to become a professional photographer. He graduated from the New York School of Visual Arts in 1993. As a professional photographer, he specialized in beauty, fashion, and celebrity portraits.

His photography has been seen on covers and features of newspapers and international magazines, such as Vogue UK, Men's Vogue, Italian Glamour, Italian GQ, French, Block, Violet Grey, WWD Beauty, Interview, Nylon, and Wonderland. His advertising clients include Diesel, Victoria's Secret, Gant Rugger, Dorchester Hotels, 7 For All Mankind, Aldo, Jean Louis David, Wella, Bloomingdale's, Regis, Kenneth Cole, L'Oréal, Garnier, Sonia Rykiel, and H&M. His photography also features the cover of British indie rock band the Arctic Monkeys's third album, Humbug.

References 

https://www.creativereview.co.uk/taste-feeling-guy-aroch-anna-palma/

https://www.coca-colajourney.co.nz/stories/coca-cola-photographers-share-their-favourite-taste-the-feeling-images#ath

https://www.nowness.com/contributor/334/guy-aroch

https://www.helmx.work/helm-x-hugo-boss

External links
 Guy Aroch's Website
 Guy Aroch's Portfolio at Jed Root
 Art Net
 Photographers Limited Editions - Online Gallery

Living people
Israeli emigrants to the United States
Fashion photographers
Artists from New York City
School of Visual Arts alumni
Year of birth missing (living people)